Microstrophia is a genus of air-breathing land snails, terrestrial pulmonate gastropod mollusks in the subfamily Enneinae of the family Streptaxidae.

Distribution 
Distribution of the genus Microstrophia include:
 Mauritius
 Réunion

Species
Species within the genus Microstrophia include:
 Microstrophia abnormala Griffiths & Florens, 2004 †
 Microstrophia baideri Griffiths & Florens, 2004 †
 Microstrophia clavulata (Lamarck, 1822)
 Microstrophia goudoti (Fischer-Piette, Blanc, C.P., Blanc, F. & Salvat, 1994)
 Microstrophia jacobsi (Griffiths, 2000)
 Microstrophia modesta Adams, 1867
 Microstrophia nana Peile, 1936
 Microstrophia toudogi (Fischer-Piette, Blanc, C.P., Blanc, F. & Salvat, 1994)
Species brought into synonymy
 Microstrophia cryptophora (Morelet, 1881): synonym of Juventigulella cryptophora (Morelet, 1881) (superseded combination)

References

 Bank, R. A. (2017). Classification of the Recent terrestrial Gastropoda of the World. Last update: July 16, 2017

External links
 Martens, E. von. (1880). Mollusken. Pp. 179-353, pl. 19-22 In K. Möbius, F. Richters & E. von Martens, Beiträge zur Meeresfauna der Insel Mauritius und der Seychellen. Berlin: Gutmann

Streptaxidae